Barbara Deming (July 23, 1917 – August 2, 1984) was an American feminist and advocate of nonviolent social change.

Personal life 

Barbara Deming was born in New York City. She attended a Friends (Quaker) school up through her high school years.

Deming directed plays, taught dramatic literature and wrote and published fiction and non-fiction works. On a trip to India, she began reading Gandhi, and became committed to a non-violent struggle, with her main cause being Women's Rights. She later became a journalist, and was active in many demonstrations and marches over issues of peace and civil rights. She was a member of a group that went to Hanoi during the Vietnam War, and was jailed many times for non-violent protest.

Deming died on August 2, 1984.

Relationships 

At sixteen, she had fallen in love with a woman her mother's age, and thereafter she was openly lesbian. She was the romantic partner of writer and artist Mary Meigs from 1954 to 1972. Their relationship eventually floundered, partially due to Meigs's timid attitude, and Deming's unrelenting political activism.

During the time that they were together, Meigs and Deming moved to Wellfleet, Massachusetts, where she befriended the writer and critic Edmund Wilson and his circle of friends. Among them was the Québécois author Marie-Claire Blais, with whom Meigs became romantically involved. Meigs, Blais, and Deming lived together for six years.

In 1976, Deming moved to Florida with her partner, artist Jane Verlaine. Verlaine painted, did figure drawings and illustrated several books written by Deming.  Verlaine was a tireless advocate for abused women.

Life's work 
Deming openly believed that it was often those whom we loved that oppressed us, and that it was necessary to re-invent non-violent struggle every day.

It is often said that she created a body of non-violent theory, based on action and personal experience, that centered on the potential of non-violent struggle in its application to the women's movement.

 Deming, Barbara: Prison Notes. New York: Grossman Publishers, 1966.
 Deming, Barbara: On Revolution and Equilibrium. Liberation, February 1968. From the collection: ed. Staughton Lynd and Alice Lynd. Nonviolence in America: A Documentary History. Revised Edition. Maryknoll, New York: Orbis Books, 1995.
 Deming, Barbara: Running Away from Myself: A Dream Portrait of America Drawn from the Movies of the Forties. New York: Grossman Publishers, 1969.
 Deming, Barbara; Berrigan, Daniel; Forest, James; Kunstler, William; Lynd, Staughton; Shaull, Richard; Statements of the Catonsville 9 and Milwaukee 14 Delivered Into Resistance The Advocate Press: 1969. 
 Deming, Barbara: Revolution and Equilibrium. New York: Grossman Publishers, 1971.
 Deming, Barbara: Wash Us and Comb Us. New York: Grossman Publishers, 1972.
 Deming, Barbara: We Cannot Live Without Our Lives. New York: Grossman Publishers, 1974.
 Deming, Barbara: A Humming Under My Feet. London: Women's Press, 1974.
 Deming, Barbara: Remembering Who We Are. Tallahassee, FL: The Naiad Press, 1981.
 Deming, Barbara; Meyerding, Jane (Editor): We Are All Part of One Another a Barbara Deming Reader . Philadelphia: New Society Publishers, 1984. 
 Deming, Barbara; McDaniel, Judith; Biren, Joan E.; Vanderlinde, Sky (Editor): Prisons That Could Not Hold . University of Georgia Press, 1995.
 Deming, Barbara; McDaniel, Judith (Editor) I Change, I Change: Poems. New Victoria Publishers, 1996.

In 1968, Deming signed the “Writers and Editors War Tax Protest” pledge, vowing to refuse tax payments in protest against the Vietnam War.

In 1978, she became an associate of the Women's Institute for Freedom of the Press.

Money for Women / The Barbara Deming Memorial Fund
In 1975, Deming founded The Money for Women Fund to support the work of feminist artists.  Deming helped administer the Fund, with support from artist Mary Meigs.  After Deming's death in 1984, the organization was renamed as The  Barbara Deming Memorial Fund. Today, the foundation is the "oldest ongoing feminist granting agency" which "gives encouragement and grants to individual feminists in the arts (writers, and visual artists)".

References

External links

 Barbara Deming: An Activist Life
 Ira Chernus, American Nonviolence: The History of an Idea
 Barbara Deming Papers. Schlesinger Library , Radcliffe Institute, Harvard University.
 A Random Chapter in the History of Nonviolence, by Michael L. Westmoreland-White
 On Revolution and Equilibrium
 On Anger
 Robson, R. (1984). "An Interview with Barbara Deming." Kalliope: A journal of Women's Art and Literature. 6(1).

1917 births
1984 deaths
American feminist writers
American pacifists
American political writers
American tax resisters
LGBT people from New York (state)
American lesbian writers
Nonviolence advocates
War Resisters League activists
20th-century American women writers
20th-century American non-fiction writers
American Quakers
Quaker feminists
20th-century Quakers
20th-century American LGBT people